Pierre Desjardins (born 9 July 1935) is a Canadian sailor. He competed in the Flying Dutchman event at the 1960 Summer Olympics.

References

External links
 
 

1935 births
Living people
Canadian male sailors (sport)
Olympic sailors of Canada
Sailors at the 1960 Summer Olympics – Flying Dutchman
Sportspeople from Montreal